Paul Michael Edmondson  (February 12, 1943 – February 13, 1970) was an American Major League Baseball (MLB) pitcher. Born in Kansas City, Kansas, the right-hander was drafted by the Chicago White Sox out of California State University, Northridge in the 21st round (419th overall) of the first-ever MLB amateur entry draft in June, 1965. In his major league debut on June 20, 1969, Edmondson pitched a complete game two-hitter in a 9–1 White Sox victory over the California Angels.

Edmondson started thirteen of the fourteen games he appeared in during his MLB career. He had the second-best earned run average (3.70) of any of the six White Sox pitchers who started ten or more games during the 1969 season.

Some of Paul Edmondson's efforts in 1969:
9 innings, 0 earned runs vs. Oakland—NO DECISION (September 13)
9⅓ innings, 1 earned run vs. California—NO DECISION (September 6)
8 innings, 1 earned run vs. Kansas City—NO DECISION (September 25)
7 innings, 1 earned run vs. Oakland—LOST 2-1 (July 8)
6⅔ innings, 1 earned run vs. California—NO DECISION (July 4)
7⅓ innings, 3 earned runs vs. Washington—NO DECISION (August 6)
6 innings, 3 earned runs vs. Seattle—LOST 3-1 (June 25)

While traveling south on rain-soaked U.S. Route 101 near Santa Barbara, California on February 13, 1970, the day after his 27th birthday, his automobile skidded and crashed into oncoming northbound traffic, killing Edmondson and his passenger, Lauraine Leas, 22, of Simi Valley, California.
They had traveled from Simi to San Luis Obispo where Lauraine would be attending Cal Poly the following semester.
The tragedy occurred only two weeks prior to spring training, and the White Sox had hoped that Edmondson would become the fourth starter in the rotation.

See also
 Chicago White Sox all-time roster
 List of baseball players who died during their careers

References

External links

Retrosheet

1943 births
1970 deaths
Sportspeople from Kansas City, Kansas
Chicago White Sox players
Major League Baseball pitchers
Baseball players from Kansas
Cal State Northridge Matadors baseball players
Evansville White Sox players
Lynchburg White Sox players
Columbus White Sox players
Hawaii Islanders players
Road incident deaths in California

ca:Paul Edmondson